L'Ortolan is a gourmet restaurant in the village of Shinfield,  south of the centre of Reading, Berkshire, England. It is located in the village's old vicarage building, which is a Grade-II listed building

The restaurant has one star in the Michelin Guide and 3 AA rosettes.

Run by John Burton-Race for 13 years, the restaurant was purchased by Peter Newman in 2000 who appointed Alan Murchison as head chef.

Murchison left in 2003, and Daniel Galmiche took over for a year. Alan Murchison returned in 2004, heading up in the company that was given the contract to run the restaurant. Lan left in 2014, and Peter Newman took over the running of the restaurant. 

In 2006, The Daily Telegraph highlighted L'Ortolan's Chef's Table as one of the very best in the country.

Since 14 September 2013, the restaurant has been operated solely by Newfee Ltd.

References

External links 
 "Alan Murchison Restaurants Ltd in liquidation" (26 November 2013) by Amanda Afiya and Neil Gerrard at The Caterer
 Alan Murchison Restaurants Limited at Gov.uk

Restaurants in Berkshire
Michelin Guide starred restaurants in the United Kingdom
Borough of Wokingham